Erika Elizabeth Spezia Maldonado (born 26 December 1975) is a Mexican politician from the Ecologist Green Party of Mexico. From 2000 to 2003 she served as Deputy of the LVIII Legislature of the Mexican Congress representing Puebla.

References

1975 births
Living people
Politicians from Puebla
Women members of the Chamber of Deputies (Mexico)
Ecologist Green Party of Mexico politicians
21st-century Mexican politicians
21st-century Mexican women politicians
Deputies of the LVIII Legislature of Mexico
Members of the Chamber of Deputies (Mexico) for Puebla